Nashport is an unincorporated community in western Licking Township, Muskingum County, Ohio, United States.  It has a post office with the ZIP code 43830.  It lies along State Route 146.

Nashport was founded in 1827, and named for Captain Thomas Nash. A post office called Nashport has been in operation since 1834. Nashport is home of Eschman Meadows. Built by Tami Longaberger, former CEO of The Longaberger Company, Eschman Meadows is ostensibly the largest home in the state of Ohio.

References

Unincorporated communities in Ohio
Unincorporated communities in Muskingum County, Ohio
1827 establishments in Ohio
Populated places established in 1827